"Sick Bubblegum" is a song by American rock singer Rob Zombie. It was written by Zombie and John 5, and released on October 3, 2009 as the second and final single from his fourth solo album Hellbilly Deluxe 2.

Review
The audio sample heard at the beginning of the song is from the American exploitation film, Werewolves on Wheels.

Production
On October 3, 2009 at 9:31 AM, Zombie allowed others to preview the song by posting a link to it via his Twitter page.  “Check out the new ZOMBIE track SICK BUBBLEGUM”.

Release
It was released on  January 8, 2010 over Roadrunner Records/Loud & Proud Records and on January 22, 2010 the video premiered at AOL Noiscreep. Skrillex has released a remix of the song, which can be found on some web sites.

Credits
Music
Rob Zombie – vocals
John 5 – guitars
Piggy D. – bass
Tommy Clufetos – drums

References

Rob Zombie songs
2010 songs
Roadrunner Records singles
2010 singles
Songs written by Rob Zombie
Songs written by John 5